"When She Was Bad" is also the name of a book by Patricia Pearson

"When She Was Bad" is the first episode in the second season of Buffy the Vampire Slayer. The episode was written and directed by series creator and executive producer Joss Whedon. The narrative follows Buffy Summers (Sarah Michelle Gellar) returning from her summer vacation and behaving strangely following her encounter with The Master in the previous season's finale. The Anointed One (Andrew J. Ferchland) attempts to revive the Master with a ritual involving his bones. However he requires something from the Slayer and sets a deadly trap in motion.

Plot
At school, Giles explains to Buffy, Xander and Willow that although they have closed the Hellmouth, the mystical energy still attracts evil forces to the town. Cordelia runs into the gang, remembering her previous encounters with the supernatural, and promises not to tell anyone Buffy is the slayer. Whilst training after school, Buffy has a vision of the Master and begins furiously hitting a dummy. At night, she dreams of being killed by him; when she wakes, Angel appears in her room to warn her of the childlike Anointed One. Buffy coldly brushes him off. He tells her he missed her and leaves before she can reply. At the Bronze, Xander and Willow worry about Buffy's behavior. Buffy then arrives in a very revealing dress and mocks Angel. She begins a slow, sensual dance with Xander in order to make Angel jealous.

Meanwhile, the Anointed One and his acolyte Absalom are forcing their vampires to dig up the Master's bones barehanded through consecrated earth.

Cordelia confronts Buffy and tells her to get over her problems. Buffy leaves and Cordelia is kidnapped by two dark figures. They throw her into a basement with an unconscious Jenny Calendar. Buffy walks to the grave that holds the bones of the Master, and finds it dug up.

At lunch the next day, Giles shares Xander and Willow's concerns about Buffy, who then shows up to tell them about her discovery. Giles remembers the existence of some revivification spells and Buffy is angered that he never told her about them. That night, the Scoobies learn that a revivification spell needs the blood of the "closest" person to the deceased. Buffy thinks she is the target, as she and Master were close. Cordelia's necklace, wrapped around a large rock, is thrown through the library window. Ignoring her friends' protests, Buffy leaves for the obvious trap, saying in frustration that she cannot look out for them while slaying.

Inside the basement where she has been led, Buffy and Angel find one female vampire. Buffy realizes that the trap is not for her. At the same time, Giles realizes that the Latin text actually said that the ritual requires the blood of those physically nearest to the Master when he died – Giles, Willow, Cordelia and Jenny. Giles and Willow are kidnapped by several vampires. Buffy returns to the library, where she finds a bloodied Xander, who is upset with her for abandoning her friends and threatens to kill her if anything happens to Willow. Buffy tortures a vampire for information on their whereabouts. Buffy interrupts the ritual and slays several vampires while Angel and Xander rescue the others. In a rage, Buffy smashes the Master's bones to bits with a sledgehammer to prevent his resurrection, before tearfully collapsing into Angel's arms as he comforts her.

The next day, Buffy apologizes for her behavior and is pleasantly surprised to find herself forgiven. Meanwhile, the Anointed One gazes at the scene of destruction, and vows revenge on Buffy.

Reception
"When She Was Bad" drew an audience of 2.9 million households. When the episode was aired as a repeat in November 1997, it scored a higher 3.1 million household rating.

Noel Murray of The A.V. Club gave "When She Was Bad" a mixed review. While he praised the opening and closing scenes as well as other smaller moments, he felt that it dealt with the characters' emotions "erratically" and was not positive towards Buffy's attitude and carrying over the Master plotline. A review from the BBC called "When She Was Bad" "another excellent episode", praising its tying up plot threads from the first season and developing the relationships between characters.

References

External links 

 

Buffy the Vampire Slayer (season 2) episodes
1997 American television episodes
Television episodes written by Joss Whedon
Television episodes about post-traumatic stress disorder
Television episodes directed by Joss Whedon

fr:Bienvenue à Sunnydale 2/2
it:La riunione